The genus  Psammolestes belongs to the subfamily Triatominae.

3 species:
Psammolestes arthuri (Pinto, 1926)  (Tc)
Psammolestes coreodes Bergroth, 1911
Psammolestes tertius Lent & Jurberg, 1965 (Tc)

(Tc) means associated with Trypanosoma cruzi

References 

Reduviidae
Cimicomorpha genera